Aramis Nabil Kouzine (born 3 October 1998) is a Canadian professional soccer player who plays for Faroe Islands Premier League club AB Argir.

Club career

FC Obolon-Brovar
Kouzine signed a contract with FC Obolon-Brovar in 2017 after a successful trial.

FC Dnipro-1
In 2019, Kouzine joined FC Dnipro-1 on a free transfer, signing a one-year contract.

Aalborg BK
In 2020, Kouzine joined AaB, signing a short-term contract after a successful trial. On 28 May 2020 AaB confirmed, that Kouzine would leave the club at the end of his contract.

Later career
After a spell at Kazakhstani club Shakhter Karagandy, Kouzine returned to Denmark on 1 April 2022, after signing a deal for the rest of the season with Danish 1st Division club Hobro IK. He left Hobro at the end of the season, prior to joining Danish 2nd Division side Thisted FC on 12 July 2022. On 9 January 2022, Thisted's sporting director confirmed that Kouzine had moved to Faroe Islands Premier League club AB Argir.

International career
Kouzine was named to the Canadian U-23 provisional roster for the 2020 CONCACAF Men's Olympic Qualifying Championship on February 26, 2020.

References

External links

1998 births
Living people
Canadian people of Ukrainian descent
Canadian soccer players
Canadian expatriate soccer players
Soccer people from Ontario
Association football forwards
FC Obolon-Brovar Kyiv players
SC Dnipro-1 players
AaB Fodbold players
FC Shakhter Karagandy players
Hobro IK players
Thisted FC players
Argja Bóltfelag players
Ukrainian First League players
Expatriate footballers in Ukraine
Canadian expatriate sportspeople in Ukraine
Expatriate men's footballers in Denmark
Canadian expatriate sportspeople in Denmark
Expatriate footballers in Kazakhstan
Canadian expatriate sportspeople in Kazakhstan
Expatriate footballers in the Faroe Islands